Greatworth is a village in the civil parish of Greatworth and Halse about  north-west of Brackley, West Northamptonshire, England. The parish also includes the hamlet of Halse. In 2011, the settlement had a population of 708. The 2011 Census recorded the parish population as 890.

History
The villages name means 'Gravelly enclosure'.

Greatworth Manor House burned down in 1793, and only its ornate gatepiers remain.

Parish church
The Church of England parish church of Saint Peter was built in the 13th century. The chancel retains Early English features including a priests' door and two lancet windows in the south wall and a trio of stepped lancets in the east wall. The west tower was added in about 1300. The nave has 17th-century features including two north windows, two south windows and the south door, and the polygonal pulpit. The chancel arch was rebuilt in 1882 under the direction of the architect H. R. Gough. It is a Grade II* listed building.

The west tower has a ring of six bells. A member of the Newcombe family, who were associated with bell-foundries in Bedford, Buckingham and Leicester, cast the tenor bell in about 1599. The fifth bell was also cast in about 1599 but the identity of the founder is unknown. Robert Taylor, who had foundries at Loughborough and Oxford, cast the fourth bell in 1825. The Whitechapel Bell Foundry cast the treble, second and third bells in 2004.

St Peter's churchyard has a notable array of historic headstones. 20 of them in are Grade II listed, and two late 17th-century English Baroque headstones are Grade II* listed.

St Peter's parish is a member of the Chenderit Benefice, which includes the parishes of Chacombe, Marston St. Lawrence, Middleton Cheney, Thenford and Warkworth.

Railways
In 1847, Parliament passed a bill for the Buckinghamshire Railway to build a branch through Buckingham to Banbury. It was built through the south of Greatworth parish and opened in 1851.

It opened in 1872 and became part of the Stratford on Avon and Midland Junction Railway in 1910. In 1951 British Railways closed the Northampton line to all traffic and the Banbury line to passenger traffic. BR closed the Banbury line to freight traffic in 1963.

RAF Greatworth
In 1949, the Air Ministry bought land from Balliol College, Oxford to create RAF Greatworth, which was an RAF radio communications station from early in the 1950s until 1988. 
In 1973, the station had a selection of high frequency (HF) radio transmitters, including the Marconi HS31 (6 kW), HS51 (30 kW), HS71 (12 kW) and the Marconi MST (Marconi Self Tuner) 1200 (30 kW). There was also a selection of Racal Speedrace transmitters, one of which offered remote control of frequency and aerial parameters from Systems Control. The aerial farm had steerable log periodic antennae, dipoles, rhombics and bicones – all types of HF antenna. A 24-hour watch system, each consisting of an RAF sergeant, a junior technician (JT), a senior aircraftman (SAC) and a civilian radio technician was maintained which carried out preventive and corrective maintenance and also re-tuned the transmitters and their drive units as directed by Systems Control at RAF Stanbridge in Bedfordshire.

After closure the site was leased to the USAF until it was handed back to the Ministry of Defence in February 1992. The site is now Greatworth Park trading estate, for which the original RAF buildings have been retained and extended.

Amenities

Greatworth has one public house, The Greatworth Inn, which is an independent freehold.

Greatworth has a post office, shop, a social club and a primary school.

References

Sources

Villages in Northamptonshire
Civil parishes in Northamptonshire
West Northamptonshire District